Gutterflower is the seventh studio album by American rock band Goo Goo Dolls. It was released in 2002 on Warner Bros. Records. It is the follow up to their critically successful albums Dizzy Up the Girl and A Boy Named Goo. The album was commercially successful upon its release, hitting No. 4 on the Billboard 200, their highest position on the chart.

Track listing

Singles
"Here Is Gone" and "Big Machine" have been the only two songs released from this album as singles and videos have been created for both. A video for the promotional single "Sympathy" was also released.

"Big Machine"
John Rzeznik refers to this as his "disco song". "I'm really horrible at programming drum machines, but this was like pattern 74 on my drum machine, which said 'disco.' I called all my friends and said, 'Check this out, this is my disco song!'" He describes it as "a propulsive tale of unrequited love". "Big Machine" was occasionally performed live on a smashed Stratocaster guitar that Rzeznik has fondly nicknamed "The Half-Caster". Despite being smashed in half, it still plays. It can be seen in a 2002 VH1 Storytellers special. Rzeznik stated that he had someone fix it up and it works just fine.

"Here Is Gone"
John Rzeznik wrote this song on the phone while talking to a friend. He asked his friend if he should "take the chords up or take 'em down?" and the friend told him to "take 'em up" and that's how he came up with the chorus and the rest of the song came together shortly thereafter.

According to Rzeznik in 2007, the video for this song cost more to produce than the entire Gutterflower album itself.

Reception
 Upon release, Gutterflower received generally positive reviews from critics. In fact, although The Goo Goo Dolls' multi-platinum album Dizzy Up the Girl (which was Gutterflower's predecessor) sold around 3,000,000 more albums than Gutterflower, reviews were equally positive.
 In 2005, Gutterflower was ranked number 499 in Rock Hard magazine's book of The 500 Greatest Rock & Metal Albums of All Time.

Personnel
Johnny Rzeznik – lead guitar, lead vocals
Robby Takac – bass, background vocals, lead vocals on "Smash", "Tucked Away", "You Never Know" and "Up, Up, Up"
Mike Malinin – drums, percussion

Charts

Weekly charts

Year-end charts

Certifications

References

External links

Goo Goo Dolls albums
2002 albums
Albums produced by Rob Cavallo
Warner Records albums